Pailhès is a commune located in the department of Ariège in Midi-Pyrenees in southwestern France. Its inhabitants are called Pailhésiens and Pailhésiennes.

Geography
This commune is located in the mountains of Plantaurel on the river Lèze and on the old national road 628 between Saint-Jean-de-Verges and Campagne-sur-Arize. It is part of the Regional Park of the Ariège Pyrenees. The Lèze flows northwest through the southeastern part of the commune, crosses the village, then flows north through the middle of the commune.

History
It is one of the villages that provide a bridge over the river Lèze.
As such it was of military significance in the Middle Ages, which resulted in the Chateau of Pailhes being built on the hill overlooking the river.  The chateau was built in the 12th century by the Comte de Foix and reached a high point when King Henri II of France stayed the night there. Many of the present day villagers now claim royal descent as a result of this visit.

Special note: Until the Revolution, the barony of Pailhes played an important role in the region. With some neighboring parishes, it formed an enclave of Languedoc in the County of Foix. With its neighboring parishes, Pailhes was part of the Episcopal Diocese of Rieux and civil diocese of Toulouse. See Cassini maps and Histariège site.

The ancient village can still be seen at the foot of the chateau while the more modern buildings are across the river.

The chateau has recently been purchased by the local historical society who are in the process of renovating it.

Transport
Pailhès was at one end of the monorail which ran from Toulouse along the valley of the Lèze.  Unfortunately this unique railway line was torn up in the inter-war years, though the stations can still be seen in each of the villages of the Lèze.

Population
Inhabitants of Pailhès are called Pailhésiens.

See also
Communes of the Ariège department

References

Communes of Ariège (department)